The 103rd edition of the Tour of Flanders was held on 7 April 2019 in Belgium. It was the 14th event of the 2019 UCI World Tour and the second monument classic of the season, following Milan–San Remo. The race was won by Italian rider Alberto Bettiol (EF Education First Pro Cycling).

The race started in Antwerp and finished in Oudenaarde, covering . It featured 17 categorized climbs and five flat sectors of cobbled roads. Dutch rider Niki Terpstra won the previous edition in 2018.

Terpstra crashed out this year in a multiple bike pile-up early in the race. He appeared to be unconscious for more than a minute, was ultimately taken to hospital and forced to abandon the race.

Teams
As the Tour of Flanders was a UCI World Tour event, all eighteen UCI WorldTeams were invited automatically and obliged to enter a team in the race. Seven UCI Professional Continental teams competed, completing the 25-team peloton.

Results

References

External links

2019 UCI World Tour
2019 in Belgian sport
2019
April 2019 sports events in Belgium